Qaleh Sarab (also Romanized as Qal‘eh Sarāb) is a village in Jey Rural District, in the Central District of Isfahan County, Isfahan Province, Iran. At the 2006 census, its population was 30, in 6 families.

References 

Populated places in Isfahan County